Weightlifting was part of the 2017 National Games of China held in Tianjin. Men competed in eight and women in seven weight classes. Since the beginning of 2017 the International Weightlifting Federation holds an equal number of men's and women's classes with the introduction of the women's 90 kg category. As of August 2017 the Chinese Weightlifting Association had not yet followed suit.

The competition program at the National Games mirrors that of the Olympic Games as only medals for the total achieved are awarded, but not for individual lifts in either the snatch or clean and jerk. Likewise an athlete failing to register a snatch result cannot advance to the clean and jerk.

Medal summary

Table

Men

Women

External links 

 中华人民共和国第十三届运动会 Results of the weightlifting competitions at the 13th National Games of China 

2017 in weightlifting
2017 in Chinese sport
2017
Weightlifting